The NCAA Season 94 basketball tournaments are the 94th basketball season of the National Collegiate Athletic Association (Philippines) (NCAA). The University of Perpetual Help System DALTA are the season hosts. Separate seniors' and juniors' tournaments are held for male college and high school students, respectively.

Format 
 In the seniors and juniors' tournament, ten (10) teams will play in a double round-robin classification.
 Once teams are tied, tie-breaker games shall be held for the top four seeds, if necessary.
 The scenarios after the elimination round ends are the following below:
If no team sweeps the elimination round, the regular playoffs (Final Four) shall be used.
If a team successfully sweep the elimination round, that team will gain an automatic bye to the finals and the stepladder playoffs shall be used.
In the semifinals, the first and second seed shall earn a twice-to-beat bonus against their respective opponents. These teams shall only need to win once to advance to the finals; while the third and fourth seed teams will need to win twice to advance to the finals.
In the stepladder semifinals, the third and fourth seed will play to determine which among them will face the second seed, The winner of the game against the second seed will meet the first seed in the finals.
The finals is a best-of-three championship series.

Teams

Name changes 

 San Beda College was granted university status by the Commission on Higher Education on February 6, 2018; thereafter renamed to as "San Beda University".

Coaches

Coaching changes

Venues

Like most Metro Manila-centric leagues, most games are held in arenas rented by the league, with games serving as neutral venues. In an innovation dubbed as "NCAA on Tour", starting in the previous season, the NCAA will continue holding Thursday games hosted at the campus of one of the teams that are playing on that day.

Main venues

NCAA on Tour venues

Squads 

Each NCAA team can have up to 15 players on their roster. At least two is allowed to be a foreigner, but only one is allowed to be on court. A team is allowed to have three additional players in the reserve list. The opening day rosters were released on July 1.

Imports
The following are the imports, or non-Filipinos included in the opening day rosters:

Letran, JRU, Mapua and San Sebastian chose not to have imports for this season. Only two teams have won championships with no imports in its roster since 2006 (Letran 2015 and San Sebastian 2009). San Beda 2011 had an import in the lineup but did not play the entire season.

Seniors' tournament

Elimination round

Team standings

Scores
Results on top and to the right of the dashes are for first-round games; those to the bottom and to the left of it are second-round games.

Match-up results

Bracket

Semifinals 
San Beda and Lyceum have the twice-to-beat advantage; they only need to win once, while their opponents twice, to advance to the finals. San Beda is in its 13th consecutive playoffs appearance (skipping the semifinals in 2010 after winning all elimination round games), Lyceum is in its first semifinals appearance (having advanced to the Finals outright last year). Letran is returning to the semifinals after a 2-year absence, while Perpetual returns after its last appearance in 2016.

San Beda vs. Perpetual 
San Beda has the twice-to-beat advantage. San Beda has won all but one of its semifinals match-ups with Perpetual since the Final Four era, with Perpetual winning in 2004, but losing in 2012, 2013, 2014 and 2016.

Prior to the game, Perpetual's wins, and its playoffs appearance, were in danger of being forfeited as several of its players played in a ligang labas game while serving residency. The league sternly reprimanded the team as it found out that the players represented a school-based team, which is allowed by the league rules.
San Beda pulled away late in the third quarter with four three-pointers by AC Soberano transformed a 1-point Altas lead to an 11-point lead for the Red Lions early in the fourth quarter. The Red Lions qualified to their 13th consecutive NCAA Finals.

Lyceum vs. Letran 
Lyceum has the twice-to-beat advantage. This is the first match-up between Lyceum and Letran in the playoffs.
Lyceum pulled away in the middle of the third quarter after Letran's JP Calvo injured his right ankle after contesting a loose ball with Mike Nzeusseu. Lyceum had a 15–0 run after Calvo's injury and led by as much 37 points.

Finals
This will be the second consecutive meeting between San Beda and Lyceum in the Finals. The Red Lions defeated the Pirates in 2017, winning all 2 games in the championship series.

 Finals Most Valuable Player: 

Prior to Game 1, Lyceum's CJ Perez, last year's Most Valuable Player, was suspended for a game after he applied to the 2018 PBA draft without notifying the Management Committee. Perez is the first person to be suspended after San Beda's Yousif Aljamal in 2007, although the league rescinded the suspension after San Beda sued in court, and threatened to leave the NCAA.

San Beda won Game 1 handily by 13 points. The Red Lions led by 31–11 in the first half and Lyceum only got to reduce the deficit by 10 points late in the fourth quarter.

After the game, Lyceum coach Topex Robinson criticized the league on Perez's suspension. Benilde coaches Ty Tang and Charles Tiu also criticized the league on social media. The Management Committee decided to defer any punishment to the coaches until the Finals are over.

San Beda defeated a full-strength Lyceum squad in Game 2. San Beda went on a 22–12 scoring run on top of a five-point lead before the fourth period to seal their 11th title in 13 seasons, and 22nd overall.

San Beda qualifies to the 2018 PCCL National Collegiate Championship Final Four. Lyceum may participate in the NCR qualifiers as of one of the two NCAA teams.

All-Star Game 
The 2018 NCAA All-Star Game is on August 31 at the Filoil Flying V Centre. The actual game was preceded by the side events patterned from the NBA All-Star Weekend.

All-Star Game MVP: Michael Calisaan (Team Saints)

Skills Challenge

Three-point Shootout

Slam Dunk Contest

Shooting Stars 

*Replaced Jerrick Balanza                                                   *****Replaced John Wilson

**Replaced Jimboy Pasturan                                               ******Replaced Kim Cinco

***Replaced Francis Lopez                                                  *******Replaced Jake Pascual

****Replaced Maui Cruz                                                       ********Replaced Ian Valdez

Awards 
The end-of-season awards were handed out before Game 2 of the seniors' finals, at the Mall of Asia Arena.
Most Valuable Player: 
Rookie of the Year: 
Mythical Five:

Defensive Player of the Year: 
All-Defensive Team:

Most Improved Player:

Players of the Week 
The NCAA Press Corps awards a player of the week sponsored by Chooks-to-Go.

Statistics

Game player highs

Season player highs

Game team highs

Season team highs

Juniors' tournament

Elimination round

Team standings

Scores
Results on top and to the right of the dashes are for first-round games; those to the bottom and to the left of it are second-round games.

Bracket

Semifinals 
LSGH and Malayan have the twice-to-beat advantage; they only need to win once, while their opponents twice, to advance to the finals. LSGH is on its second consecutive semifinals appearance, Malayan is in its fourth and San Beda is in its eighth consecutive semifinals appearance. JRU returns to the semifinals after a 1-year absence.

LSGH vs. JRU 
This is the first playoffs match-up between LSGH and JRU since the 2008 first round of the stepladder semifinals in which JRU won in overtime.

Malayan vs. San Beda 
This is the first playoffs match-up between Malayan and San Beda since the 2016 Finals in which Malayan won its first championship under the Malayan name, in three games.

Finals
This is the second consecutive meeting between LSGH and Malayan in the Finals. In 2017, LSGH won its first-ever NCAA championship after defeating the erstwhile defending champions Malayan.

Finals Most Valuable Player:

Awards 
The end-of-season awards were handed out after Game 2 of the juniors' finals at the Mall of Asia Arena.
Most Valuable Player: 
Rookie of the Year: 
Mythical Five:

Defensive Player of the Year: 
All-Defensive Team:

Most Improved Player:

See also 
 UAAP Season 81 basketball tournaments

References

External links
Official website

94
2018–19 in Philippine college basketball